Estradiol/estrone/estriol (brand name Hormonin) is a combination pharmaceutical medication produced by Shire which contains the estrogens estradiol (0.3 or 0.6 mg), estrone (0.7 or 1.4 mg), and estriol (0.135 or 0.27 mg) in a single oral tablet.

See also
 List of combined sex-hormonal preparations

References

Combination drugs
Estrogens